Neville-Rolfe is a British double-barrelled surname which may refer to: 

 Lucy Neville-Rolfe (born 1953), British politician and businesswoman
 Sybil Neville-Rolfe (1885–1955), British social hygienist

See also
Neville (name)
Rolfe (surname)

Compound surnames